Harestua Station is located on the Gjøvik Line at Harestua in Norway. The station was opened as Harestuen in 1901 as a stop for passengers and freight one years ahead of the opening of the Gjøvik Line in 1902. In 1971, the station became fully automatized and remote controlled. There is no ticket machine at the station.

References

External links 
 Entry at the Norwegian Railway Club 

Railway stations in Lunner
Railway stations on the Gjøvik Line
Railway stations opened in 1901
Railway stations closed in 2012
Disused railway stations in Norway
1901 establishments in Norway
2012 disestablishments in Norway